Virgil Johnson may refer to:

 Virgil Johnson (ice hockey) (1909–1993), American ice hockey player
 Virgil Johnson (singer) (1935–2013), African American deejay and singer